The Leander-class, or Type 12I (Improved) frigates, comprising twenty-six vessels, was among the most numerous and long-lived classes of frigate in the Royal Navy's modern history. The class was built in three batches between 1959 and 1973. It had an unusually high public profile, due to the popular BBC television drama series Warship. The Leander silhouette became synonymous with the Royal Navy through the 1960s until the 1980s.

The Leander design or derivatives of it were built for other navies:
Royal New Zealand Navy as the Leander class
Chilean Navy: 
Royal Australian Navy: 
Indian Navy: 
Royal Netherlands Navy:

Design
The policy adopted by the Royal Navy during the 1950s of acquiring separate types of frigates designed for specialised roles (i.e. anti-submarine, anti-aircraft and aircraft direction) had proved unsatisfactory. Although the designs themselves had proved successful, the lack of standardisation between the different classes led to increased costs during construction and also in maintenance once the ships became operational. Furthermore, it was not always possible to have the ships with the required capabilities available for a specific task. The first move towards creating a truly general-purpose frigate came with the Type 81 Tribal class which was initially ordered in 1956. The 24-knot speed of the Tribals was considered the maximum possible for tracking submarines with the new medium-range sonars, entering service. The type 81 gas turbine saw the frigates underway quickly, without taking hours flashing up steam turbines, and the provision of a helicopter for long-range attack were considered essential in the nuclear age. These ships were mainly intended to operate in the tropics but lacked the speed and armament required for the priority fleet carrier escort role East of Suez, where fast radar picket capability was important, as much as anti-submarine capability. So the new frigates would combine the roles of the T12 and T61. The fully air-conditioned Royal New Zealand Navy Rothesay class variant, which gave all the crew a bunk and cafeteria messing and a RNZN commissioned design study for a more fully capable Type 12 frigate, which also assessed whether the Type 12 could carry 2 of the larger Wessex AS helicopters, was used as the basis of the RN Leander Improved Type 12 design. 
   
On 7 March 1960, the Civil Lord of the Admiralty C. Ian Orr-Ewing stated that the "Type 12 Whitby-class anti-submarine frigates are proving particularly successful ... and we have decided to exploit their good qualities in an improved and more versatile ship.  This improved Type 12 will be known as the Leander class. The hull and steam turbine machinery will be substantially the same as for the Whitbys. The main new features planned are a long-range air warning radar, the Seacat anti-aircraft guided missile, improved anti-submarine detection equipment and a light-weight helicopter armed with homing torpedoes. We shall also introduce air conditioning and better living conditions."  The 1963 edition of Jane's Fighting Ships described it as a "mainly anti-submarine but flexible and all-purpose type".

The difference between the Leanders (Type 12I) and the Whitbys (Type 12) was most obviously that the stepped quarterdeck of the Type 12 had been done away with, resulting in a flush deck, with the exception of the raised forecastle. The superstructure had been combined into a single block amidships and a new bridge design gave improved visibility. A hangar and flight deck were provided aft for the Westland Wasp light anti-submarine helicopter, which was still at the prototype stage when the first ships were ordered. The ship was air conditioned throughout and there were no portholes in order to improve nuclear, biological and chemical defence. The ships were all given names which had previously been given to Royal Navy cruisers, mostly of characters from classical mythology, the exceptions being Cleopatra and Sirius.

The Y160 boiler variant used on the Batch 3 Leanders (such as ) also incorporated steam atomisation equipment on the fuel supply so the diesel fuel entering the boilers via the three main burners was atomised into a fine spray for better flame efficiency. Some ships with Y100 Boilers were also converted to steam atomisation, HMS Cleopatra being one of them. The Leander-class frigates did have Babcock & Wilcox boilers but of a more conventional two-drum design, one water drum and one steam drum, much like a Yarrow boiler without the second water drum. The water drum was offset to one side and below the furnace and steam drum. The two boilers fitted were 'handed' with the water drum inboard on both. Many Leanders had six-burner furnaces (known as Five and a Half Boilers) and the output was varied by altering the number of burners in use.

Construction programme

Royal Navy

Royal New Zealand Navy

Midlife major refits
The entire class were designed for a standard weapons fit when built, with a twin 4.5-inch Mark 6 gun mount, GWS-22 Seacat missile system and Limbo anti-submarine mortar, though the first seven entered service fitted with two single 40 mm Bofors guns on the hangar roof instead of Seacat, with the SAM system fitted later.  All but one of the ships had Seacat GWS-22; the exception was Naiad, which had Seacat GWS-20.  However, advances in weapons systems led to a number of different conversions being undertaken on various members of the class. This saw the class grouped into four broad batches:
Ikara - installation of the Ikara ASW missile system in place of the 4.5-inch gun mount, plus an additional Seacat missile system.
Exocet/Seacat - installation of Exocet anti-ship missile system in place of 4.5-inch gun mount, plus two additional Seacat missile systems.
Exocet/Seawolf - installation of Exocet anti-ship missile system in place of 4.5-inch gun mount; replacement of Seacat with single GWS-25 Seawolf surface-to-air missile system.
Gun - retained 4.5-inch gun mount and Seacat missile system.

Batch 1, Ikara conversion

Eight of the first ten Leanders were given the so-called "Batch 1" or "Ikara" conversion, which saw the Ikara anti-submarine warfare missile installed in place of the 4.5-inch gun, plus an additional Seacat system, and the removal of the Type 965 radar and its AKE(1) aerial.  The internal space previously used by the Type 965 was used for the ADAWS needed for Ikara.

Batch 2, Seacat/Exocet conversion

Two of the Leanders with Y-100 machinery, and five out of the six with Y-136 machinery, were given the so-called "Batch 2" or "Exocet" conversion.  This conversion gave them Exocet anti-shipping missiles in place of the 4.5-inch gun mount, 2 additional Seacat systems, and the ability to operate the Lynx helicopter.

Batch 2, navigational training ship conversion
Juno, commissioned 18 July 1967, was converted to serve as a navigational training ship. Work at Rosyth began in January 1982 and completed in February 1985. This conversion involved the removal of the Type 965 radar and all of her armament. The flight deck was extended by plating over the mortar well; the STWS 1 torpedo system and two 20 mm guns were installed. Juno replaced  in the training role, as well as serving as the trials ship for the Type 2050 sonar.

Batch 3, Seawolf/Exocet conversion

The Seawolf conversion gave the broad-beamed Leanders Exocet anti-shipping missiles in place of the 4.5-inch mounting, a Seawolf missile system in place of Seacat, Sonar 2016, and the ability to operate the Lynx helicopter.  All the radar systems were removed and replaced by Type 967, 968, 1006 and 910 radars. Only five of the broad-beamed Leanders were converted to carry Seawolf due to costs (£70 million for each refit) and, as a lesser consideration, to retain some ships capable of naval gunfire support.

† = Latest estimate as at 14 December 1983.

Batch 2 TA & Batch 1B - towed array conversions

In 1981 the Admiralty said that they intended to devote "substantial resources to improving the effectiveness of the sensors and anti-submarine weapons ... This includes the new passive towed array system that we hope to introduce into service next year."

The former destroyer  and the frigate  were used for testing prototypes in 1978–1981. It was planned to install them on Rothesay conversions, but this was not possible due to industrial strikes.  Scheduling then made it easier to fit them onboard four of the Batch II Leanders.  "Compensation for the additional 70 tons of top weight included lowering the Exocet launchers.  This interesting quartet was to have been followed by five Batch III Leanders, but the latter fell foul of the Nott cancellations.  A fifth Leander, the Ikara-carrying HMS Arethusa, was fitted with a towed array in 1985, the year the towed-array trials ship Lowestoft was withdrawn from service."

Admiral Sir Julian Oswald said to the Defence Committee in 1989, "in order to capitalise on the really very exciting and important development of towed arrays, we had to get them to sea as soon as we could. The only sensible, cost-effective option open to us was to take some relatively older ships - the Leanders - and convert them quickly to the towed array. We have done that with great success, and the peacetime patrols have achieved some remarkable results, but there has been a price to pay because of the age of those ships."

In general, "as a ship gets older it tends to get noisier - the hull and also the propulsion system". At the same Defence Committee meeting, Oswald spoke "to counter the presumption that older ships get noisier. That is not necessarily true and it is not true, in my experience, in the case of the Leanders because understanding of ship-generated noise is improving all the time and our techniques for countering it are improving - our noise monitoring and so on - so, despite the fact that these ships are getting older, they are in many cases managing to improve their performance with regard to ship noise." Captain Geoffrey Biggs said "the Leanders are remarkably quiet in operation and our experience has been that they have made excellent towed-array platforms despite the rather short notice of actually getting the towed-array programme together to start with.  They actually perform very well."

Five ships were converted to use Waverley Type 2031(I) towed array (passive search very low frequency).  They were as follows:

Royal Navy service

During their lengthy service with the Royal Navy Leanders were employed during the Indonesia–Malaysia confrontation in 1963-1966. The 1973 and 1975-1976 Cod Wars in the latter of which HMS Diomede suffered severe damage with a 30 feet gash in its hull after being rammed by an Icelandic Coast Guard gunboat. The frigates with their thin hulls being much less suited to this duty than the later offshore patrol vessels.

Four members of the class saw action during the 1982 Falklands War, three Batch Two conversions, HMS Argonaut, HMS Minerva and HMS Penelope  Argonaut experienced 15 air attacks in San Carlos Sound and was hit by a number of bombs and cannon fire; it was stranded for six days, with two bombs lodged in the forward Seacat magazine and boiler room. The first Seawolf conversion HMS Andromeda, was one of only three Seawolf fitted frigates available with the Royal Navy's newest missile in the war and served during the war as the critical "goalkeeper"- the last line of defence for the carrier HMS Invincible during the war. The five unconverted, gun-armed, broad-beam Leanders, arrived in the war zone in the last week of the conflict and immediately after it to serve with the post-war task force led by the brand new carrier HMS Illustrious. An Argentine naval dive team planned to place limpet mines on HMS Ariadne at Gibraltar during the conflict (Operation Algeciras). The last Leander commissioned in 1973,  like the two built for Chile, carried special electronic warfare systems, for countering Exocet missiles, and the Argentine services may have anticipated the Ariadne was scheduled for service in the Total Exclusion Zone, which in fact did not happen until after the end of the war.

The ships performed excellently in Royal Navy service, with relatively low noise levels giving the 2031(I) towed sonar a range of more than 100 miles, better than that of the more advanced 2031(Z) sonar when fitted in the Type 22 frigates. However, all Leanders in Royal Navy service were decommissioned by the early 1990s due to the ships' ageing design and the high number of crew. Scylla was sunk on 27 March 2004 as an artificial reef off Cornwall, eleven years after her decommissioning in 1993.

Running costs

Overseas service
Royal Navy ships were sold to the navies of Chile, Ecuador, New Zealand ( becoming  and  becoming HMNZS Southland), India and Pakistan.

Pakistan decommissioned the last of its Leander-class frigates, Zulfiqar, in January 2007,  India decommissioned her last Leander class on 24 May 2012.

, the last steam-turbine driven Leander-class frigate in the Royal New Zealand Navy, was decommissioned in Auckland on 31 March 2005 after 33 years operational service.  In 2006 it was announced that the ship was to be sunk as a dive attraction in the Bay of Islands, and this was carried out on 3 November 2007 at Deep Water Cove. She lies near her sister ship .

Fate
Royal Navy

See also
 List of naval ship classes in service
 , the original Type 12 frigate.
 , the follow-on Type 12M frigate.
 Warship, a BBC television drama series.

Notes

References

Bibliography
 Allanway, Jim (1995) Leander Class Frigates, H M Stationery Office, 
 
 Jackson, Robert (2006) The Encyclopedia of Warships, From World War Two to the Present Day, Grange Books Ltd, 
 Marriott, Leo (1990), Royal Navy Frigates Since 1945, Second Edition, Ian Allan Ltd (Surrey, UK), 
 Meyer C J (1984) Modern Combat Ships 1: Leander Class, Littlehampton Book Services Ltd, 
 Osbourne, Richard and Sowdon, David (1991), Leander Class Frigates: History of Their Design and Development, 1958-90, World Ship Society, 
 Purvis, M K, Post War RN Frigate and Guided Missile Destroyer Design 1944-1969,  Transactions,  Royal Institution of Naval Architects (RINA),  1974

External links

 Archived comprehensive website on the design and history of the Leander class and related frigate designs
 Leander (Type 12) class frigate website
 Hazegray.org on the Leander class
 An unofficial Leander Class Frigate Site
 British Film Institute site on Warship
 Royal Navy leaflet on Warship, from the HMS Phoebe Association website
 Comments on Warship by series Director Michael Briant
 Webpage (at Home > Scriptwriting > Warship) about Michael J Bird's scripts for Warship
 HMS Phoebe Association website
 HMS Danae website (all commissions)
 HMS Danae website (first commission)
 HMS Dido Association website 
 HMS Jupiter Association website
 HMS Hermione Association website 
 HMS Naiad Association website ("the leander class frigate")
 Postwar Frigates website, retrieved 2010-10-12

 
Frigate classes
Ship classes of the Royal Navy